The Military Sealift Command , is an organization that controls the replenishment and military transport ships of the Indonesian Navy. Military Sealift Command has the responsibility for providing sealift and ocean transportation for all Indonesian military services as well as for other government agencies. It first came into existence on 1 July 1961 when the Naval Transport Department was established as the sole service responsible for the Ministry of Defense's ocean transport requirements for both peacetime and war.

History
Military Sealift Command was formed in Jakarta on 1 July 1961 under the name of the Naval Transport Department using for heavy amphibious transport purposes the Navy's newly acquired Teluk Langsa-class tank landing ships from the US and one Polnocny-class landing ship, manufactured in Poland for the service. The establishment of the Dalmil was based on considerations for the logistical interests of the Navy and the Indonesian National Armed Forces in general, including the interests of the government in the field of sea transportation.

Along with the launching of Operation Trikora for the liberation of West Papua effective December 1961, its baptism of fire, Dalmil was renamed into the Naval Transport Command in April 1962.

On 27 February 1970, the name was renamed into the Naval Transport Service in February 1970. Later that year on 4 May, it was renamend again to Military Sealift Command. 

Starting 23 July 1971, the name of the Military Sealift Command used and confirmed as the official title  based on the resolution of the office of the Minister of Defense and Security/Commander of the Armed Forces, concerning Organizational Principles and the needs of the ALRI.

In 1985, the Military Sealift Command was organized into two Sealift Forces when the National Fleet Command, upon which it supported for 24 years, was split into the Western and Eastern Fleets.

Area Commands 
Military Sealift Command has the main task of fostering the capability of the Military Sea Transportation system, fostering the potential of national sea transportation for the benefit of national defense, carrying out sea transportation of the National Armed Forces and National Police which includes personnel, equipment and supplies, both administrative and strategic tactical and carrying out sea transportation assistance in order to support national development.

In accordance with the functions and duties of carrying out a shift in military strength, both troops and logistics by sea in all Indonesian waters. Sea crossing activities by Military Sealift Command elements as well as elements under the Operational Control of Military Sealift Command can be carried out individually or in formation both in times of peace and war. Shifting troops and logistics can be done from a Naval Base, Public Port, Coast to Naval Base or to a Public Port and other beaches.

Development 
In the field of development, Military Sealift Command is tasked with compiling and planning programs for the development of elemental strength, terminals and supporting facilities and infrastructure within the ranks of the command through maintenance, delivery, tactical development and procedures for Military Sea Transportation in accordance with the level and environment of its authority

Program 
In the operational field, Military Sealift Command coordinates and prepares plans and programs for sea transportation for all ranks of the National Armed Forces and National Police. As a Principal Command carrying out operational duties, the Military Sealift Command operates several ships of various types, including: Tank Landing Ship, General Support, Personnel Transport Assistance and Landing Platform Dock types.

Besides the Navy facilities, it includes the management of two Military Sealift Command terminals, as an element of the Executing Command or Anglanas responsible for the three Executive Commands:

 Military Sealift Force Jakarta
 Military Sealift Force Surabaya
 Military Sealift Force Makassar

Fleet 
Military Sealift Command operates several types of Landing Ship Tank (LST) elements based in naval bases in Jakarta, Surabaya, and Makassar. These bases form the basis of the Military Sealift Command's Sealift Forces, which correspond to the three Naval Fleet Commands.

Military Sealift Force Jakarta

Military Sealift Force Surabaya

Military Sealift Force Makassar

Commander 

See also 

 Indonesian Navy

References

External links
https://lantamal3.koarmabar.tnial.mil.id/Home.aspx

Indonesian Navy
Military units and formations established in 1961